Hyposmocoma communis is a species of moth of the family Cosmopterigidae. It was first described by Otto Swezey in 1946. It is endemic to the Hawaiian islands of Kauai and Oahu. The type locality is Honolulu.

External links

communis
Endemic moths of Hawaii
Moths described in 1946